Mercer County is a county on the southeastern border of the U.S. state of West Virginia. At the 2020 census, the population was 59,664. Its county seat is Princeton. The county was originally established in the State of Virginia by act of its General Assembly on March 17, 1837, using lands taken from Giles and Tazewell counties.

Mercer County is part of the Bluefield, WV-VA Micropolitan Statistical Area.

History

Battle of Clark's House (1862)

Geography

In 1863, West Virginia's counties were divided into civil townships, with the intention of encouraging local government.  This proved impractical in the heavily rural state, and in 1872 the townships were converted into magisterial districts.  Mercer County was divided into five districts: Beaver Pond, East River, Jumping Branch, Plymouth, and Rock.  In the 1970s, Mercer County's five historic districts were consolidated into three new magisterial districts: District 1, District 2, and District 3.  The new districts were renamed "District I", "District II" and "District III" during the 1980s.

Major highways

The West Virginia Turnpike, now part of Interstate 77, begins in Princeton.

Adjacent counties
Raleigh County (north)
Summers County (northeast)
Giles County, Virginia (east)
Bland County, Virginia (south)
Tazewell County, Virginia (southwest)
McDowell County (west)
Wyoming County (northwest)

National protected area
 Bluestone National Scenic River (part)

Demographics

2000 census
As of the census of 2000, there were 62,980 people, 26,509 households, and 17,946 families living in the county. The population density was 150 people per square mile (58/km2). There were 30,143 housing units at an average density of 72 per square mile (28/km2). The racial makeup of the county was 92.56% White, 5.82% Black or African American, 0.19% Native American, 0.46% Asian, 0.01% Pacific Islander, 0.10% from other races, and 0.85% from two or more races. 0.45% of the population were Hispanic or Latino of any race.

There were 26,509 households, out of which 26.70% had children under the age of 18 living with them, 53.00% were married couples living together, 11.20% had a female householder with no husband present, and 32.30% were non-families. 28.70% of all households were made up of individuals, and 13.60% had someone living alone who was 65 years of age or older. The average household size was 2.33 and the average family size was 2.85.

In the county, the population was spread out, with 21.10% under the age of 18, 9.80% from 18 to 24, 26.20% from 25 to 44, 25.50% from 45 to 64, and 17.40% who were 65 years of age or older. The median age was 40 years. For every 100 females, there were 91.10 males. For every 100 females age 18 and over, there were 87.70 males.

The median income for a household in the county was $26,628, and the median income for a family was $33,524. Males had a median income of $29,243 versus $19,013 for females. The per capita income for the county was $15,564.  About 14.70% of families and 19.70% of the population were below the poverty line, including 28.90% of those under age 18 and 12.70% of those age 65 or over.

The county is part of the Bluefield, WV-VA micropolitan area.

2010 census
As of the census of 2010, there were 62,264 people, 26,603 households, and 17,313 families living in the county. The racial makeup of the county was 91.6% white, 6.1% black or African American, 0.5% Asian, 0.2% American Indian, 0.2% from other races, and 1.4% from two or more races. Those of Hispanic or Latino origin made up 0.8% of the population. In terms of ancestry, 16.4% were Irish, 14.2% were German, 12.0% were English, and 11.2% were American.

Of the 26,603 households, 27.8% had children under the age of 18 living with them, 47.6% were married couples living together, 12.9% had a female householder with no husband present, 34.9% were non-families, and 30.1% of all households were made up of individuals. The average household size was 2.30 and the average family size was 2.83. The median age was 42.5 years.

The median income for a household in the county was $32,131 and the median income for a family was $42,517. Males had a median income of $37,423 versus $25,778 for females. The per capita income for the county was $18,431. About 16.0% of families and 22.8% of the population were below the poverty line, including 32.5% of those under age 18 and 11.4% of those age 65 or over.

Politics
Mercer County's political history is largely typical of West Virginia. It was supportive of remaining with Confederate Virginia when the state was created and voted Democratic in the first few post-Civil War elections. However, the influence of coal industry executives turned the county towards the GOP during the "System of 1896". As with most of West Virginia, extensive unionization caused the county to swing to the Democratic Party during most of the twentieth century, but an extremely rapid swing towards the Republican Party has occurred since 2000, due to declining unionization, along with regional views on environmental, social and cultural issues that are increasingly at odds with the national Democratic Party.

Education
The Mercer County Public School System has nineteen elementary schools, including Athens, Bluefield Intermediate, Bluewell, Brushfork, Ceres, Glenwood Elementary, Lashmeet-Matoaka, Melrose, Memorial, Mercer County Early Learning - Bluefield and Princeton sites, Mercer, Montcalm, Oakvale (funding for constructing a new Oakvale school has been approved), Princeton Primary, Spanishburg, Straley, Sun Valley and Whitethorn. There are six middle school facilities including Princeton Middle, Bluefield Middle, Montcalm Middle, PikeView Middle, and Glenwood Middle. There are also four high school facilities, including Princeton Senior (AAA), Bluefield High (AA), Montcalm High (A) and PikeView High (AA). The Mercer County Technical Education Center, which is being transitioned into a comprehensive technical high school. Mercer County Schools educates approximately 9200 students. The professional and service staff number about 1200.

Higher educational institutions include Bluefield State College, located in Bluefield; Concord University, located in Athens; and New River Community and Technical College, located in Princeton, West Virginia.

Law enforcement
Mercer County is protected by seven agencies. Five agencies protect the incorporated areas of the county, but the non-incorporated area is the primary responsibility of the Mercer County Sheriff's Department. The Mercer County Sheriff's Department consists of 30 sworn law enforcement officers and a number of civilian employees. Within the Mercer County Sheriff's Department are several specialized units to better serve the citizens.

K-9 Unit: Deputy Ballard (Quando), Deputy Parks (Arrow), Deputy Rose (Mitis), & Deputy Ellsion (Max).

Detective Bureau: Cpl. Murphy, Detective Sparks, & Detective Combs.

SWAT: Sgt. G. W. Woods, Cpl. J. J. Ruble, Cpl. S. A. Sommers, & Detective Combs. The rest of the team consists of other agencies within the county, excluding the State Police.

The Sheriff's Department has one dedicated Deputy who serves on the Southern Regional Drug and Violent Crime Task Force.

Mercer County is also home to the Princeton Detachment of the West Virginia State Police and a Turnpike Detachment (Highway Patrol).

Communities

Cities
Bluefield (largest city)
Princeton (county seat)

Towns
Athens
Bramwell
Oakvale
Rock

Magisterial districts
District I
District II
District III

Census-designated places
Bluewell
Brush Fork
Lashmeet
Montcalm
Matoaka

See also
 Camp Creek State Park
 National Register of Historic Places listings in Mercer County, West Virginia
 Pinnacle Rock State Park
 Pipestem Resort State Park
 Pocahontas coalfield
 Tate Lohr Wildlife Management Area

References

External links
County website
Mercer County Convention and Visitors Bureau
Mercer County Public Schools

 
1837 establishments in Virginia
Populated places established in 1837
Bluefield micropolitan area
Counties of Appalachia
Former counties of Virginia